Mauro Salvador Blanco (born 25 November 1965 in San José de Positos) is a retired Bolivian footballer, who played in midfield.

International career
A player from The Strongest he obtained a total number of nine caps for the Bolivia national football team in 1997, scoring two goals; both in a friendly match against Jamaica on 1997-03-23 at his debut in the Estadio Jesús Bermúdez in Oruro, Bolivia. He represented his country in 3 FIFA World Cup qualification matches.

Honours

Club
 Blooming
 Liga de Fútbol Profesional Boliviano: 1998

References

External links
FIFA Profile

1965 births
Living people
People from Gran Chaco Province
Bolivian footballers
Bolivia international footballers
Association football midfielders
1997 Copa América players
Bolivian Primera División players
The Strongest players
Club Blooming players
Oriente Petrolero players
Club Real Potosí players